Encyclometridae is a family of trematodes belonging to the order Plagiorchiida.

Genera:
 Encyclometra Baylis & Cannon, 1924
 Polylekithum Arnold, 1934

References

Plagiorchiida